Ding Kung-wha (born 25 October 1953) is a Taiwanese politician who served as the Chairperson of Financial Supervisory Commission in 2016.

Early life
Ding obtained his bachelor's degree in public finance and taxation from National Chung Hsing University in 1976 and master's degree in public finance from National Chengchi University in 1978.

Financial Supervisory Commission chairmanship
Ding assumed the Financial Supervisory Commission chairmanship on 20 May 2016, with the Tsai Ing-wen-appointed Lin Chuan cabinet. He resigned on 3 October, to take responsibility for a scandal involving Mega International Commercial Bank and Bai Chi Gan Tou Digital Entertainment Company's unsuccessful bid to merge with XPEC Entertainment.

References

1953 births
Living people
Political office-holders in the Republic of China on Taiwan
National Chung Hsing University alumni
National Chengchi University alumni